Vardar Film (Macedonian Cyrillic: Вардар Филм) is a film production and distribution company based in Skopje, North Macedonia. It began operations in 1947, when North Macedonia was part of the former Yugoslavia.

The company produced Films: Tetoviranje (1991), Happy New Year '49 (1986), Haj Faj (1987), Tri Ani (1959), The mountain of anger (1968).
The Studio has made about 700 documentary short and animated films in period from 1947 till 1991. In 2013 the Government of Macedonia has decided to rename the company from Vardar Film Skopje to Vardar Film Macedonia.

Selected filmography
 Frosina (1952)

References

Mass media companies established in 1947
Mass media companies of North Macedonia
1947 establishments in Yugoslavia
Companies based in Skopje
Cinema of Yugoslavia